The Ponte della Libertà (Liberty Bridge) is a road bridge connecting the islands that form the historical centre of the city of Venice to the mainland part of the city.

Designed in 1932 by engineer Eugenio Miozzi, it was opened by Benito Mussolini in 1933 as Ponte Littorio ("Lictor's bridge") – a name used during the Fascist era for several other Italian bridges. 
At the end of World War II it was renamed Ponte della Libertà to honour the end of the Fascist dictatorship and of the Nazi occupation. 

The bridge is the only vehicular access to the historical centre of the Venice. 
 The eastern end of the road terminates in the Piazzale Roma, the bus depot for the historical centre.
 The western end reaches mainland Venice and becomes the Via Libertà, which divides the Venetian boroughs of Mestre (north) and Marghera (south).

There is also a pedestrian and cycle path on the southern side. It was built alongside the Venice Railway Viaduct, which had been constructed in 1846. This has two tracks each way and is still in use.

In popular culture
The bridge was a major location for the White Album fight in the manga and anime JoJo's Bizarre Adventure: Golden Wind.

See also
The Causeway, Bermuda: A similar bridge in Bermuda

References

Bridges in Venice
Ponte della Libertà
Road bridges in Italy
Ponte della Libertà
Ponte della Libertà
Ponte della Libertà